Waimea is a census-designated place (CDP) in Hawaii County, Hawaii, United States. The population was 7,028 at the 2000 census and 9,212 at the 2010 census. Since each U.S. state cannot have more than one post office of the same name, and there is a post office in Waimea, Kauai County, the official U.S. Post Office designation for Waimea is Kamuela, although this name is only used by the post office, not by locals or the local government. The name Waimea means reddish water.

Waimea is the center for ranching activities and paniolo culture. The Parker Ranch in and around Waimea is the largest privately owned cattle ranch in the United States, and the annual Fourth of July rodeo is a major event. The Waimea Cherry Blossom Heritage Festival, held annually in the first week of February, has recently become another major event of the town. In the center of town are the Isaacs Art Center, the Wishard Gallery, Paniolo Heritage Center at Pukalani Stables, and the Gallery of Great Things, all featuring Hawaiian art.

Waimea is home to the headquarters of two astronomical observatories located on Mauna Kea, the W. M. Keck Observatory and the Canada–France–Hawaii Telescope. It is also headquarters of the International Lunar Observatory Association.

Waimea also is the home of Hawaii Preparatory Academy and Parker School (Kamuela, Hawaii), two of the top independent schools in Hawaii.

History

Native Hawaiian
It is believed that the watershed area of the Kohala mountains once supported several thousand native Hawaiians, who practiced subsistence agriculture, made kapa, and thatched dwellings. As the Europeans arrived in the area, most of the sandalwood (Santalum ellipticum) forests were harvested and the land became ideal for grazing animals. California longhorn cattle were given as a gift to Hawaiian King Kamehameha I by British Captain George Vancouver in 1793. In 1809, John Palmer Parker arrived to the area after jumping ship and over time became employed by the king to hunt and tame the population of cattle, which at this point had grown out of control. In 1815 Parker married Kipikane, the daughter of a high-ranking chief, and as a family developed what is now Parker Ranch, the largest ranch in the area.

Waimea's post office name "Kamuela" is the Hawaiian name for "Samuel", after Samuel Parker (1853–1920), the grandson of John Parker. It is sometimes claimed that the post office is named for former Hawaiʻi Island politician Samuel Mahuka Spencer, suggesting he was a Postmaster for the facility, but there are no records that indicate he ever held that position. What seems plausible (and is supported by documentation within the records of the US Board of Geographic Names) is the story that the Kamuela Post Office was named for Samuel “Kamuela” Parker, grandson of John Parker (founder of the Parker Ranch.)<ref
name="imagesofoldhawaii.com"></ref>

Spanish
The early 19th century also saw the arrival from the Viceroyalties of New Spain and Río de la Plata of the horse and Spanish vaqueros ("cowboys"), bringing the traditional Euro-Latin culture of riding and roping skills. The king hired these vaqueros to teach Hawaiians herding and ranching skills, and by 1836 the island had working cowboys. As the Hawaiian culture and Latin vaquero cultured commingled, a unique breed of cowboy emerged, the paniolo.

World War II
During World War II, beef and vegetable prices increased, and farmers returned to cultivate maize, beets, cabbage and a variety of other green vegetables. Farm and ranchland acreage increased from 75 in 1939 to 518 in 1946. Waimea saw many soldiers during this time who built a large temporary tent city, Camp Tarawa. When the war was over and the military had left, Waimea had an entertainment center, now Kahilu Theatre, and an airstrip, now Waimea-Kohala Airport.

Geography
It sits at the southern foot of Kohala, the oldest volcano on the island, and it is near the northwestern base of Mauna Kea, the highest volcano.

Hawaii Route 19 passes through the community, leading southeast  to Hilo and southwest  to Kailua-Kona via a route close to the shore.

Demographics

As of the census of 2000, there were 7,028 people, 2,371 households, and 1,782 families residing in the CDP. The racial makeup of the CDP was 30.65% White, 0.33% Black or African American, 0.17% Native American, 20.29% Asian, 15.61% Native Hawaiian and other Pacific Islander, 0.73% from other races, and 32.23% from two or more races. Hispanic or Latino of any race were 7.80% of the population.

There were 2,371 households, out of which 39.0% had children under the age of 18 living with them, 56.6% were married couples living together, 13.2% had a female householder with no husband present, and 24.8% were non-families. 18.9% of all households were made up of individuals, and 5.7% had someone living alone who was 65 years of age or older.  The average household size was 2.95 and the average family size was 3.36.

In the CDP the population was spread out, with 29.7% under the age of 18, 7.1% from 18 to 24, 28.1% from 25 to 44, 25.0% from 45 to 64, and 10.1% who were 65 years of age or older.  The median age was 36 years. For every 100 females, there were 97.4 males.  For every 100 females age 18 and over, there were 94.0 males.

The median income for a household in the CDP was $51,150, and the median income for a family was $55,822. Males had a median income of $36,710 versus $27,217 for females. The per capita income for the CDP was $20,773.  About 4.2% of families and 6.0% of the population were below the poverty line, including 8.7% of those under age 18 and 5.4% of those age 65 or over.

Climate
Waimea displays a warm summer Mediterranean Climate (Köppen climate classification Csb). The town sits at the transition between the wet and dry sides of the Big Island, and its weather therefore often changes dramatically over less than a mile.

Festivals
The relatively quiet town becomes animated when the Waimea Cherry Blossom Heritage Festival is held on the first weekend of February. The rodeo and Horse Races are held at Parker Ranch on July 4 each year.

See also

 List of census-designated places in Hawaii
 History of Hawaii

References

External links

Census-designated places in Hawaii County, Hawaii
Populated places on Hawaii (island)